Penicillium cartierense is a fungus species of the genus of Penicillium which is named after Cartierheide in the Netherlands where this species was first found.

See also
List of Penicillium species

References

cartierense
Fungi described in 2014